Gerhard Huttula (1902–1996) was a German cinematographer and film director. Huttula was known for his skill at special effects. During the Nazi era he shot a number of ethnographic documentaries and travelogues. He worked for a while in Argentina where he was credited as Gerardo Huttula.

Selected filmography

Cinematographer
 Outside the Law (1937)

Special effects
 Friedemann Bach (1941)
 The Great Love (1942)
 Diesel (1942)
 Kolberg (1945)

References

Bibliography 
 Newton, Ronald C. The "Nazi Menace" in Argentina, 1931-1947. Stanford University Press, 1992.

External links 
 

1902 births
1996 deaths
Film people from Berlin
German documentary film directors